The discography of Swedish DJ Sebastian Ingrosso consists of three EPs and twenty-one singles. Three of his EPs were released in 2004 with his debut Mode Machine being released on January 1, his second Stockholm Disco on April 16 and his third Hook da Mode on June 2. His first single to chart in a country was "Get Dumb", a collaboration fellow Swedish House Mafia members Axwell and Steve Angello, and frequent collaborator Laidback Luke. The song, included in Swedish House Mafia's debut studio album Until One, charted in the Netherlands at number 45. Ingrosso's debut single was released in 2004, titled "Yo Yo Kidz", with Angello.

Extended plays

Singles

Other charted songs

Remixes

Releases under an alias

As Axwell Λ Ingrosso (with Axwell)

As Buy Now! (with Steve Angello)

As Fireflies (with Steve Angello)

As General Moders (with Steve Angello)

As Mode Hookers (with Steve Angello)

As Outfunk (with Steve Angello)

As Swedish House Mafia (with Axwell and Steve Angello)

As The Sinners (with Steve Angello)

See also 
Swedish House Mafia discography
Axwell & Ingrosso discography
Axwell discography
Steve Angello discography

References 

Discographies of Swedish artists
Electronic music discographies